Nivsani is a village located in Kair Tehsil, in the Aligarh district of Uttar Pradesh, India.

References 

Villages in Aligarh district